The following is a timeline of the history of the city of Burlington, Vermont, USA

Prior to 19th century
 1763 - Town charter granted by the British Province of New Hampshire.
 1774 - Settlement established.
 1791
 March 4: Town becomes part of the State of Vermont.
 November 3: University of Vermont founded. 
 Burlington becomes shire town of Chittenden County.
 1797 - Burlington Mercury newspaper begins publication.

19th century
 1801 - Vermont Sentinel newspaper begins publication.
 1802 - Court house built.
 1804 - Grasse Mount built, now  a campus building of the University of Vermont
 1810 - Population: 1,690.
 1813 - August 2: Town besieged by British forces.
 1815 - September: University of Vermont begins operating again.
 1816 - Unitarian Church built.
 1823 - Methodist Episcopal Church established.
 1825 - LaFayette visits town.
 1826 - Champlain Transportation Company founded.
 1827
 Free Press Weekly begins publication.
 Champlain Glass Company established.
 1829
 Lyman block built.
 Burlington High School and Burlington Fire Company incorporated.
 1830 - Episcopal Society of Burlington founded.
 1834 - Baptist church established.
 1842 - Burlington Mechanics' Institute founded.
 1845 - Winooski Mill Company established.
 1847
 E. & E. Lyman in business.
 Commercial Bank of Burlington and Burlington Savings Bank chartered.
 1848 - Central Vermont Railway began operating (until 1995).
 1849
 Rutland & Burlington Railroad built.
 Central Vermont Railway begins operating.
 1852 - Burlington Lyceum founded.
 1853 - Medical College established as part of the University of Vermont.
 1854
 Town Hall built.
 Vermont Episcopal Institute incorporated.
 1856 - Van Sicklen & Walker grocers in business.
 1857
 Custom House built.
 Burlington Breakwater Lights established. 
 1858
 Marine Hospital built.
 Burlington Times newspaper begins publication.
 1862 - University of Vermont library building constructed.
 1865
 Burlington chartered as a city; town of South Burlington established.
 Albert Catlin becomes mayor.
 Vermont Agricultural College incorporated with the University of Vermont. 
 Home for Destitute Children founded.
 1866 - St. Joseph's Orphan Asylum incorporated.
 1867
 J.M. Henry & Sons in business.
 Cathedral of the Immaculate Conception built.
 1869 - First Methodist Church of Burlington built.
 1870
 City market building constructed.
 E.S. Fullam & Co. in business.
 Population: 14,387. 
 1872
 Winooski & Burlington Horse Railroad incorporated.
 Wells, Richardson & Co. in business.
 1873
 Fletcher Free Library established.
 County courthouse built.
 1874 - Park House (hotel) in business.
 1877 - Howard Opera House built (approximate date).
 1878 - Burlington Commercial School established.
 1879 - Mary Fletcher Hospital founded.
 1880 - Population: 11,365.
 1884 - Burlington Venetian Blind Company incorporated.
 1885
 Old Ohavi Zedek Synagogue built.
 Urban A. Woodbury becomes mayor.
 1886 - Daniel Webster Robinson House built.
 1887 - Cathedral of Saint Joseph completed.
 1888 - Burlington Cotton Mills incorporated.
 1889
 St. Mary's academy founded.
 Baldwin Refrigerator Company established (approximate date).
 1890 - Population: 14,590.
 1894
 Queen City Cotton Co. incorporated.
 William J. Van Patten becomes mayor.
 Burlington Daily News begins publication.
 Fort Ethan Allen established.
 1897
 Burlington Masonic Temple built.
 Battery Park established.
 1900 - Population: 18,640.

20th century

 1902 - Fletcher Free Library re-located.
 1904 - Strong Theatre opens.
 1905
 Burlington Electric Department created.
 McIntosh and Crandall engineering company in business.
 1910 - Population: 20,468.
 1916 - Union Station operated until 1953.
 1920 - First aircraft lands at Burlington International Airport.
 1922
 State Tree Nursery relocates from Burlington to Essex.
 Champlain Valley Fair begins in nearby Essex.
 1925 - Trinity College founded.
 1926 - Ira Allen Chapel dedicated.
 1930 - Flynn Theatre built.
 1948 - U.S. Coast Guard Station Burlington established on Juniper Island.
 1953 - Ethan Allen Air Force Base activated.
 1964 - Burlington High School moves to current location; as part of a major realignment of the city's schools, Edmunds Elementary opens on the former campus replacing Adams (sold off and repurposed as office space) and Converse (demolished in urban renewal) schools.
 1967
 City Council expands to 13 aldermen.
 Population: 35,531.
 1969 - Howard Center headquartered in city.
 1972 - Cathedral of the Immaculate Conception destroyed by arson.
 1973 - Burlington International Airport new terminal opens.
 1977 - Cathedral of the Immaculate Conception re-built (closed 2018)
 1978 - Ben & Jerry's in business.
 1981
 Church Street Marketplace constructed.
 Bernie Sanders becomes mayor.
 1983 - City government Community and Economic Development Office established.
 1989
 Outright Vermont founded.
 Peter Clavelle becomes mayor.
 1990
 Burlington City Arts established.
Cara Wick designs the flag of Burlington as a school project.
 1993
 City Council expands to 14 councilors.
 Population: 39,127.
 1998 - City website online.
 2000 - "Legacy Plan" for development created.

21st century

 2003 - Howard Dean presidential campaign, 2004 headquartered in Burlington.
 2006 - Bob Kiss becomes mayor.
 2009 - Vermont Daily News begins publication.
 2010 - Population: 42,417.
 2012 - Miro Weinberger becomes mayor.
 2014 - with the purchase of the Winooski 1 hydroelectric project on the Winooski River electricity comes from 100 percent renewable sources
 2015 - Bernie Sanders presidential campaign, 2016 headquartered in Burlington.
 2017 - Owen and Lucas Marchessault win a competition to redesign the former flag of Burlington. Their winning design is the current flag of the city.

See also
 Burlington history
 Burlington, Vermont metropolitan area
 National Register of Historic Places listings in Chittenden County, Vermont

References

Bibliography

Published in the 19th century
 
 
 
 
 
 
 
  + 1879 ed.
 
 
 
 
 
 

Published in the 20th century
 
 
 
 
  + Chronology
 
  (fulltext via Open Library)

Published in the 21st century
  (series of articles about Burlington, Vt.), 2014-

External links

 
 Items related to Burlingon, various dates (via Digital Public Library of America).
 Images related to Burlington, Vermont, various dates (via New York Public Library)
 Items related to Burlington, Vermont, various dates (via U.S. Library of Congress, Prints & Photos division)

burlington
burlington